Early Assamese or Proto-Eastern Kamarupa is an ancestor of the modern Assamese language. It is found in the literature from the 14th century to the end of 16th century in Kamata kingdom and rest the Brahmaputra valley of Assam.

Literature
Early Assamese literature period can be split into: a) The Pre-Vaishnavite period and b) The Vaishnavite sub periods. The Pre-Vaishnavite period covers the period before the advent of Sankardeva and the Vaishnavite period initiated by his literary activities. The earliest Assamese writer, viz. Hema Saraswati and Harivara Vipra who composed Prahlada Charitra and Babruvahana parva respectively wrote under the patronage of King Durlabhanarayana of Kamatapura who ruled towards the end of the 13th or the earlier part of the 14th century. The next two important poets of the same period are Rudra Kandali and Kaviratna Saraswati who composed Drona parva and Jayadratha vadha. But the towering poet of this period is Madhava Kandali who is respectfully referred to by Sankardeva (b. 1449) as his predecessor. Madhava Kandali flourished towards the end of the 14th century and translated the entire Ramayana under the patronage of Mahamanikya, the then Kachari (Varāha) king of Central Assam.

Writing system

Early Assamese was written in Eastern Nagari script.

Morphology and Grammar

Pronouns

Notes

References

 
 

 

Eastern Indo-Aryan languages
 
Languages of Assam
Subject–object–verb languages
Indo-Aryan languages